The 1989 Freedom Bowl was a college football bowl game played on December 30 at Anaheim Stadium in Anaheim, California.  The game featured the Washington Huskies of the Pacific-10 Conference and the Florida Gators of the Southeastern Conference, who were led by junior Emmitt Smith, a consensus All-American at running back.

Teams

Washington

The Huskies opened with two wins, lost three straight, then won five of six to finish the regular season  tied for second in the Pac-10.

Florida

The Gators lost their opener, won six straight, then lost three of four to finish the regular season  tied for fourth in the SEC.  Head coach  resigned in early October after allegations of NCAA rules  and defensive coordinator Gary Darnell was the interim

Game
Washington built a twenty-point lead at halftime and  Smith gained only 17 yards on seven carries, as Florida was forced to go to the air in the second half. It was Smith's lowest rushing total since his first game as a freshman, when he was a reserve.

Scoring
First quarter
Washington – Mario Bailey 21 pass from Cary Conklin (John McCallum kick)
Florida – Donald Douglas 67 run (John David Francis kick)
Washington – Field goal, McCallum 21
Washington – Andre Riley 10 pass from Conklin (McCallum kick)

Second quarter
Washington – Jaime Fields recovered blocked punt in end zone (McCallum kick)
Washington – Field goal, McCallum 32

Third quarter
No scoring

Fourth quarter
Washington – Mark Brunell 20 run (McCallum kick)

Statistics
{| class=wikitable style="text-align:center"
! Statistics  !! Washington !! Florida 
|-
|align=left|First Downs || 28 || 10
|-
|align=left|Rushes–yards|| 45–191|| 25–83
|-
|align=left|Passing yards || 242 || 148
|-
|align=left|Passes || 24–44–0 || 11–28–1
|-
|align=left|Total yards || 433 || 231
|-
|align=left|Punts–average ||7–37|| 8–33
|-
|align=left|Fumbles–lost ||0–0|| 7–3
|-
|align=left|Turnovers by||0||4
|-
|align=left|Penalties-yards ||9–86|| 9–85
|-
|align=left|Time of possession ||41:52||18:08
|}

Aftermath
Smith skipped his senior season and was selected seventeenth overall in the 1990 NFL Draft; he won three Super Bowls with the Dallas Cowboys and is a member of the Pro Football Hall of Fame.

This was the last bowl game between the Pac-10 and SEC until the 2010 season, when Auburn met Oregon in the national championship game in Arizona.

References

Freedom Bowl
Freedom Bowl
Florida Gators football bowl games
Washington Huskies football bowl games
Freedom Bowl
December 1989 sports events in the United States